Rivaz or de Rivaz is a surname. Notable people with the surname include:

Alice Rivaz (1901–1998), Swiss author
Charles Montgomery Rivaz (1845-1926), British colonial administrator
François Isaac de Rivaz (1752–1828), French inventor and politician
Pierre de Rivaz (1711–1772), French clockmaker 
Vincent de Rivaz (born 1953), French businessman